The 1955 Chicago Cardinals season was the 36th season the team was in the league. The team improved on their previous output of 2–10, winning four games. They failed to qualify for the playoffs for the seventh consecutive season.

Schedule

Standings

References

Arizona Cardinals seasons
Chicago Cardinals
Chicago Card